Robert Evans Peterson (November 12, 1812 – October 30, 1894) was an American book publisher and author. He also studied law and medicine, but never took up either profession.

R. E. Peterson was born in Philadelphia, Pennsylvania, to George and Jane (Evans) Peterson. His family included several publishers and editors: his brother Henry Peterson edited the Saturday Evening Post for twenty years,  and his cousin Charles J. Peterson was an owner of the Post and founder of Peterson's Magazine.

Peterson received a commercial education and engaged in the hardware business until 1834, when he married Hannah Mary Bouvier, the daughter of Judge John Bouvier. He then studied law with his father-in-law and assisted him in editing his law works. He was admitted to the bar in 1843, and in order to absolve the debt of his clients, Daniels & Smith, booksellers, purchased their business, conducting it as R. E. Peterson & Co. On the death of John Bouvier in 1851 he established with George W. Childs the publishing house of Childs & Peterson, which became involved in 1857–58.  Peterson then retired from the publishing and bookselling business and took up the study of medicine. He was graduated at the University of Pennsylvania, M.D., 1863, but did not practice, devoting his life to study. He presented Judge Bouvier's law library to the University of Pennsylvania.

After his wife died in 1870, he was married, in 1872, to Blanche Gottschalk, sister of Louis M. Gottschalk, and after her death in 1879, thirdly, to her sister Clara. He published Bouvier's Law Dictionary and Bouvier's Institutes of American Law; edited: Familiar Science, a Guide to Scientific Knowledge of Things Familiar; Dr. Kane's Arctic Explorations; Brazil and Brazilians, and numerous text books, and was the author of: The Roman Catholic Church not the Only True Religion (1891). He died in Asbury Park, New Jersey and interred at Laurel Hill Cemetery in Philadelphia.

References

External links

1812 births
1894 deaths
American book publishers (people)
Writers from Philadelphia
Perelman School of Medicine at the University of Pennsylvania alumni
19th-century American businesspeople